Chi means either "a hornless dragon" or "a mountain demon" (namely) in Chinese mythology. Hornless dragons were a common motif in ancient Chinese art, and the chiwen  (lit. "hornless-dragon mouth") was an imperial roof decoration in traditional Chinese architecture.

Word
In Modern Standard Chinese usage,   "hornless dragon" occurs in words such as:
 —"hornless dragon"; i.e. making it clear that a dragon and not a demon is being talked about.
 —"carved dragon handle (esp. on cups)"
 —"a roof ornament shaped like a dragon". Compare the homophonous variant .
  or chītóu —"an architectural adornment; gargoyle"
 —"carved patterns of sinuous dragons (esp. on pillars/bronzes)"
 —"steps of the imperial palace; the Emperor"

Characters

This   "hornless dragon" is also a variant Chinese character for chi  (differentiated with the "ghost radical" ) "mountain demon", which only occurs in the compound chimei  "mountain and forest demons; evil spirits; goblins".

  :  "A mountain spirit and wild beast, [the pictograph] comes from its birdlike head, legs, and tail." 
  :  "[A creature] like a dragon and yellow, in the north, they call it , [the pictograph] comes from the "bug radical" and a chi  phonetic, or, a hornless [dragon] is called chi." 
  :  "A kind of ghost/demon, [the ideograph] comes from the "ghost radical" and chi  "mountain demon radical", which is also the phonetic."
Its name is the earth-cricket. It devours humans."

Etymologies
The etymology of chi "dragon; demon" is obscure. Carr reviews three proposals by Peter A. Boodberg, Paul K. Benedict, and James Matisoff.

Boodberg proposed that chi  or  etymologically descends from a Sino-Tibetan root *brong-bri "wild oxen", from *brong "wild bull" and *bri or *brien "wild cow". He described this root as a "semantic atom, a referential complex with the meaning of 'wild' → 'wild animal' → 'couple'", and applied this etymon to many male and female animal couples, including *lywung < *blwong  "male dragon" and *t'ia  "female dragon". Compare how Yin and Yang cosmology dichotomized rainbow-dragons between Yang/male hong  "primary rainbow" and Yin/female ni  "secondary rainbow".
Benedict noted how Karlgren inconsistently reconstructed Old Chinese *t'lia for chi  "a mountain demon",  "a kind of demon", and  "a kind of dragon; a demon"; but *lia for all the other words in this phonetic series (e.g., li  "drip", li  "ornamental scarf"). Benedict reconstructed Old Chinese *xlia  "a mountain demon", deriving from a Proto-Tibeto-Burman *sri(-n) "demon" root, also evident in Tibetan sri "a species of devil or demon; a vampire", srin-po "demons", and Lushai hri < *sri "the spirit believed to cause sickness". He additionally hypothesized the *xlia  phonetic was cognate with shen < *[ly]yěn  "spirit; god" from Proto-Tibeto-Burman *[s-l]-rin < *[s-]rin.

Matisoff analyzes Benedict's *sri(-n) "demon" root as *s-r-i-n, and links Chinese *xlia  with another Tibetan cognate hdre-srin "goblins and demons" (from hdre "goblin; demon; evil spirit").

Meanings
Chinese classic texts use chi  to mean both "a hornless dragon" and "a mountain demon". The following discussion focuses upon earliest recorded usages in pre-Han texts, some of which have uncertain dates of compilation.

Hornless dragon
The Lüshi Chunqiu (c. 239 BCE) quotes Confucius comparing long  "dragons", chi  "hornless dragons", and yu 魚 "fish".
The dragon eats and swims in clear water; the one-footed dragon eats in clean water but swims in muddy water; fish eat and swim in muddy water. Now, I have not ascended to the level of a dragon but I have not descended to that of fish. I am perhaps a one-footed dragon!
The reason for translating "one-footed dragon" is unclear. Compare the legendary Kui  "a one-footed dragon".

The Chuci (c. 2nd century CE) uses chi  five times, which is more than any other Chinese classic. Two contexts mention xuanchi  "dark/black hornless-dragon"; "They lined water monsters up to join them in the dance"; and "Driving black dragons, I travel northwards." Another mentions qingqiu  "green horned-dragons" and  "white hornless-dragons"; "With a team of azure dragons, white serpents in the traces." Two final contexts mention chi  with long  "dragons"; one describes a team of four dragons: "I ride a water chariot with a canopy of lotus; Two dragons draw it, between two water-serpents"; the other uses the compound chilong  "hornless dragon": "And water dragons swim side by side, swiftly darting above and below."

The Huainanzi (c. 139 BCE) "Peering into the Obscure" chapter mentions chichi  "red hornless-dragon" and baichi  "white hornless-dragon". The former occurs with qingqiu  "green horned-dragon": "When the red hornless dragon and the green horned dragon roamed the land of Chi , the sky was limpid and the earth undisturbed." The latter occurs with benshe  "fast snake": the chariot of Fu Xi and Nüwa was "preceded by white serpents and followed by speeding snakes."

The "Records of the Grand Historian" (c. 100 BCE) biography of Sima Xiangru includes two of his fu  poems that mention chichi  "red hornless dragons." "The Shanglin Park"  mentions them with jiaolong , "Here horned dragons and red hornless dragons"; "Sir Fantasy"  mentions them with qingqiu , "red hornless dragons and green horned dragons."

Theses texts describe black, white, and red chi  "hornless dragons", which contradicts the Shuowen Jiezi "like a dragon and yellow" definition. However, a possible explanation might be found in the Hanshu commentary of Wei Zhao, which describes the chi  demon as "resembling a tiger with scales".

Many later dictionaries—for instance, the Guangya (c. 230 CE), Longkan Shoujian (997 CE), and Piya (c. 1080 CE)—define a contrast between qiu  "horned dragon" and chi  "hornless dragon".  
De Groot provides a picture of a sepulchral stone tablet decorated with a chi and the Gujin Tushu Jicheng illustration of this hornless dragon.

Mountain demon

The chī variant  used in  chīmèi ("demon; evil spirit") only occurs as a bound morpheme in chimèi, but mèi occurs in other expressions such as mèilì ("enchantment; fascination; charm"). Both modern Chinese and Japanese normally use "ghost radical"  characters to write chīmèi  and wangliang or mōryō , but these were not regularly used in classical texts.

Chimei  is joined with wangliang in the expression chimei-wangliang  "demons and monsters; evil spirits".  Since some commentators differentiate between chimei "demons of the mountains and forests" and wangliang "demons of the rivers and marshes", chimei-wangliang can mean either "'demons, monsters' generally or 'mountain and water demons' separately". De Groot describes chimei as "another demon-tribe" because the "Chinese place in their great class of hill-spirits certain quadrumana, besides actual human beings, mountaineers alien to Chinese culture, perhaps a dying race of aborigines."

The Zuozhuan (c. 389 BCE) commentary to the Chunqiu has the earliest textual usages of both chimei  and chimei-wangliang .

Both the chimei contexts concern banishing evildoers into dangerous wilderness regions. The former (18;) refers to the Sixiong  "Four Fiends" (Hundun , Qiongqi , Taowu , and Taotie ); the legendary ruler Shun, "banished these four wicked ones, Chaos, Monster, Block, and Glutton, casting them out into the four distant regions, to meet the spite of the sprites and evil things". Du Yu's commentary glosses chimei as "born in the strange qi of mountains and forests, harmful to humans". The latter context only mentions the villainous Taowu: "The ancient kings located T'aou-wuh in [one of] the four distant regions, to encounter the sprites and other evil things."

The chimei-wangliang  context records how Yu the Great, legendary founder of the Xia Dynasty, cast nine instructional bronze ding "tripod cauldrons" to acquaint people with all the dangerous creatures in China's Nine Provinces.
Anciently, when Hea was distinguished for its virtue, the distant regions sent pictures of the [remarkable] objects in them. The nine pastors sent in the metal of their provinces, and the tripods were cast, with representations on them of those objects. All the objects were represented, and [instructions were given] of the preparations to be made in reference to them, so that the people might know the sprites and evil things. Thus the people, when they went among the rivers, marshes, hills, and forests, did not meet with the injurious things, and the hill-sprites, monstrous things, and water-sprites, did not meet with them [to do them injury]. 
Note how Legge translates each chimei-wangliang syllable individually: chimei "injurious things, and the hill-sprites" and wangliang "monstrous things, and water-sprites".

Wang Chong's Lunheng  (late 1st century CE) considers the chimei as a dragon hybrid, "Those who give their opinion on the ch'i, state that they are dragon-like beings; therefore, as the word mei is copulated to (the name of) a dragon, the mei must be a congener of this animal."

Mythic parallels

In Chinese folklore and art, most dragons, including the long , are represented with two horns. Besides the chi , only a few dragons supposedly lacked horns, for instance, jiaolong  "aquatic dragon; hornless dragon; crocodile" or qiulong  "horned dragon; hornless dragon".

In comparative mythology as well, horned dragons are generally more common than hornless ones. Based upon the chishou  "hornless-dragon head" roof adornment, Kroll translates chi as wyvern, "a footed winged dragon with a serpent's tail, becoming in medieval times an oft-pictured heraldic beast."

Notes

References
 
 
  Digitalized edition 2007 Chicoutimi Canda - Paris by Pierre Palpant.
  Digitalized edition 2007 Chicoutimi Canda - Paris by Pierre Palpant.
 
 
 
 
 

Footnotes

Further reading

External links

螭 entry, Chinese Etymology
螭 entry page, 1716 CE Kangxi Dictionary
Jade awl of a chi dragon, Warring States period, National Palace Museum
Marble chishou hornless dragon head, Yuan Dynasty, Los Angeles County Museum of Art
Lacquerware vase with hornless dragon design, Qing Dynasty, National Palace Museum
Hornless dragon on a porcelain plate, Qing Dynasty, Royal Alberta Museum

Chinese legendary creatures
Chinese dragons
Chinese iconography